Bethune  is a village in the Canadian province of Saskatchewan within the Rural Municipality of Dufferin No. 190 and Census Division No. 6. Arm River flows along a river valley north of Bethune, which features camping sites, and the Qu'Appelle River is a short way south. Last Mountain Lake or Long Lake is north-east of Bethune whereas Buffalo Pound Lake is just south-west.

The post office of Bethune, Assiniboia, NWT was established on 5 June 1905, three months before Saskatchewan became a province.

History 
Bethune incorporated as a village on 2 August 1912. The village takes its name from C.B. Bethune, the engineer on the first train to travel the railway in 1887.

Demographics 

Attractions 
Bethune has a skating rink, curling rink, park, school, and baseball diamonds located on the outskirts of town at McLean Park. It has a playground splash pad and four baseball diamonds. Bethune is home to the Bethune Bulldogs of the senior men's Highway Hockey League.

The Gillis Blakley Bethune and District Heritage Museum is a Municipal Heritage Property on the Canadian Register of Historic Places.

Nearby attractions include Buffalo Pound Provincial Park, Grandview Beach, Kedleston Beach, and Regina Beach Recreation Site.

See also 
List of villages in Saskatchewan
List of communities in Saskatchewan
List of rural municipalities in Saskatchewan

References

Further reading 
Wagon trails to blacktop: A history of Bethune. Published: Bethune, Sask. Bethune & District Historical Society. 1983. .

External links 

Villages in Saskatchewan
Dufferin No. 190, Saskatchewan
Division No. 6, Saskatchewan